Cornelius Mac Curtain (Gaelic: Concubar Mac Curtain) (1658-1737), Catholic priest and Irish poet, celebrated from his Latin, Irish, and English prose composed in the late 17th and early 18th century.

Life
Mac  allegedly descended from the Macartan clan of Ulster, although the place of his birth is unknown. was ordained in Cork City, Ireland in 1684 by Pierce Creagh, the titular Bishop of Cork. He was the parish priest of Glanmire, residing at Coole, in County Cork. He was buried at Temple Loircte.

References

1658 births
1737 deaths
17th-century Irish Roman Catholic priests
18th-century Irish Roman Catholic priests
17th-century Irish poets
18th-century Irish poets
Irish poets